Angidi Verriah Chettiar CBE (29 April 1928 – 15 September 2010) was a Mauritian politician who served twice as the second vice president of Mauritius until his death in September 2010.

Early life 
Angidi Chettiar was born in Aruppukkottai in Virudhunagar district in the Indian state of Tamil Nadu. He came to Mauritius at the age of 10. His family were traders.

Political career
Angidi Chettiar throughout his political career was a staunch member of the Mauritius Labour Party. He served the party for more than 50 years and held the position of treasurer of the party for a few decades. Before being appointed Vice-President of Mauritius, Angidi Chettiar was a member of the Legislative Assembly for many years, serving as Government Chief Whip and eventually Minister in the Government of Prime Minister Sir Seewoosagur Ramgoolam from 1980 to 1982.

He served a first term as vice president from 1997 to 2002, and he briefly became acting president in 2002 when Cassam Uteem resigned. However, Chettiar also resigned within days after refusing to sign a controversial anti-terrorism bill, saying that the bill was discriminatory against Muslims. The line of succession then bestowed the presidential powers and duties onto Supreme Court Justice Ariranga Pillay.

After the come-back of Navin Ramgoolam, current Leader of Mauritius Labour Party, to power, Chettiar was reappointed as Vice-President of Mauritius for a second term by the President of Mauritius, Anerood Jugnauth, in 2007.

He died while serving as vice president on 15 September 2010. He suffered from health problems for a few months before his death. He is survived by four sons and one daughter. Another son has already died.

Honours
:
 Grand Officer of the Most Distinguished Order of the Star and Key of the Indian Ocean (GOSK)
:
 Commander of the Most Excellent Order of the British Empire (CBE)

References

Politicians from Madurai
Presidents of Mauritius
Vice-presidents of Mauritius
Mauritian Hindus
2010 deaths
Mauritian people of Indian descent
Mauritian people of Tamil descent
Mauritian Tamil politicians
1928 births
Labour Party (Mauritius) politicians
Mauritian politicians of Indian descent
Grand Officers of the Order of the Star and Key of the Indian Ocean
Commanders of the Order of the British Empire
Recipients of Pravasi Bharatiya Samman